The Nokia 2600 classic is a Nokia Dual-band GSM phone E900/1800 or E850/1900 (for some markets) that includes a VGA camera, FM radio, Bluetooth, E-mail and mobile Internet access via a WAP browser. Additionally, the Nokia 2600 supports MMS and Nokia Xpress Audio Messaging, for recording and editing messages on the go. It also had a similar sliding variant called Nokia 2680 slide.

Technical specifications

Key features
 MP3, MIDI ringtones and user-created ringtones (Voice Recorder)
 FM radio
 Pre-paid Tracker
 Bluetooth 2.0
 SMS, MMS, email, and Nokia Xpress Audio Messaging
 1000-entry phone book
 Supports 2G Cellular Data feature (class 6, downlink only)

Operating frequency
 Dual band GSM 850/1900 MHz
 Dual band EGSM 900/1800 MHz

Dimensions
 Volume: 63.5 cc
 Weight: 73.2 g (with battery)
 Length: 109.6 mm
 Width: 46.7 mm
 Thickness: 12 mm

Display
 65K color, 128x160 pixels

Imaging
 VGA camera
 TFT color display
 MMS

Multimedia
 Digital VGA camera with video recorder for pictures and video
 FM radio

Messaging
 Email supports POP3, IMP4 and SMTP protocols
 Nokia Xpress Audio Messaging (sends greetings with short voice clips)
 SMS text messages
 MMS messaging with pictures
 Personalize SMS message alerts with your favorite ringtones

Java applications
 xHTML over TCP/IP, WAP 2.0
 MMS 1.2 (supports 300KB size)
 Nokia Xpress Audio Messaging
 Java MIDP 2.0 applications
 OMA DRM 1.0 smart content download (forward lock)

Connectivity
 Photo and data sharing with Bluetooth 2.8

Browsing
 WAP 2.0 web browser (Xhtml) (This feature is network dependent)

Personal information management (PIM)
 Powerful organizer with week and month review, and localized calendar
 Advanced calculator
 Converter II (metric/inches, temperature etc.)
 10 digit calculator with square root support, scientific and loan calculation features
 English-Chinese dictionary (APAC & China - selected variants only)
 Analog/digital clock
 Expense manager

Power management
 Operation times vary depending on the network, SIM card and usage
 Battery: BL-5BT
 Capacity: 870 mAh
 Talk time: Up to 6 hrs
 Stand-by: Up to 24 days

Sales package contents
 Nokia 2600 classic
 Nokia battery BL-5BT
 Nokia standard charger AC-3, new AC-6C for China variant, CA-100c
 Nokia HS-47 Stereo Headset
 Extra Xpress-On Cover

Operating system
 Series 40 5th Edition LE

Operating frequency
 Dual band EGSM 900/1800 MHz
 Dual band GSM 850/1900 MHz

Memory
 Max User Storage: 13.7mb
 Maximum Heap Size: 1 mb

Extra features
 Handsfree Speaker
 Themes

Regional availability
 Africa
 Asia-Pacific
 China
 Europe
 Middle East
 North America (US, Canada and Mexico)

Sales package contents (Europe)
 Nokia 2600 classic
 Nokia Stereo Headset WH-101
 Nokia Compact Charger AC-3
 Nokia Battery BL-5BT
 Xpress-on colour cover (Midnight Blue with Sunset Orange or Sandy Gold with Sky Blue)
 User guide

Sales package contents (Asia)
 Nokia 2600 classic
 Nokia battery BL-5BT
 Nokia standard charger AC-3
 Nokia HS-47 Stereo Headset
 Extra Xpress-On Cover

Sources
 Nokia Europe
 Nokia Bangladesh 
 Forum Nokia

2600
Mobile phones introduced in 2008